Carlos Gallardo (born June 22, 1966) is a Mexican actor, producer, occasional screenwriter and director. Gallardo frequently collaborates with his friend, director Robert Rodriguez.

Life and career
Gallardo was born in Ciudad Acuña, Coahuila, Mexico, to a Mexican father and an Irish mother.

Gallardo's first taste of fame came with the feature film El Mariachi, a critically acclaimed film renowned for costing US$7,000 to make. The film won the 1993 Sundance Film Festival, and won Gallardo an Independent Spirit Award for Best First Feature, an accolade he shared with Rodriguez. He also was credited as unit production manager and for special effects in El Mariachi.

Following El Mariachi, Gallardo went on to be co-producer of the Robert Rodriguez-directed Mexico Trilogy sequels, Desperado and Once Upon a Time in Mexico. Both films featured Antonio Banderas in the role of El Mariachi, in place of Gallardo, though Gallardo had a minor role in Desperado, playing El Mariachi's friend, Campa.

Gallardo co-wrote, produced and starred in the title role of 2004 independent action thriller, Bandido. He was also producer for 2004 Colombian TV series Me amarás bajo la lluvia.

Carlos also participated in the Robert Rodriguez production titled Curandero where he plays the lead. Curandero was directed by Eduardo Rodriguez.

In 2007 he played Deputy Carlos in Planet Terror, Robert Rodriguez's portion of Grindhouse, appearing opposite Michael Biehn and Tom Savini. It was his first appearance in a Rodriguez film since Desperado.

Filmography

References

External links

Interview: Carlos Gallardo at IGN
https://www.facebook.com/pages/Carlos-Gallardo/169294239805686?bookmark_t=page

Living people
Mexican male film actors
Mexican film directors
Mexican film producers
Mexican screenwriters
Mexican people of Irish descent
Male actors from Coahuila
1966 births
People from Acuña, Coahuila